Banister is a French surname, and may refer to;

Banister comes from the Old French or Old Norman banastre which was a type of wicker basket also related to the Modern French banne and to Occitan banasta.

Barbara Banister, English artist
Cyan Banister (born 1977), American investor and entrepreneur
Frederick Banister, English civil engineer
Guy Banister (1901–1964), a career employee of the Federal Bureau of Investigation and a private investigator
Henry Banister, English politician who sat in the House of Commons in 1614 and in 1625
 Henry Charles Banister (1831–1897) English author, composer and professor at Royal Academy of Music
Jeff Banister (born 1964), American professional baseball player and coach
John Riley Banister, American law officer, cowboy and Texas Ranger
Richard Banister, English oculist of Stamford, Lincolnshire
Scott Banister (born 1975), American entrepreneur

See also
Banister Fletcher (junior) (1866–1953), English architect and architectural historian
Banister Fletcher (senior) (1833–1899), English architect, surveyor and politician 
John Banister (disambiguation)
Thomas Banister (disambiguation)
William Banister (disambiguation)
Bannister (disambiguation)
Roger Bannister, English former athlete, physician and academic

Norman-language surnames
Occitan-language surnames
Surnames of French origin
Occupational surnames